Rinko can refer to:

People
, Japanese photographer
, Japanese actress
, Japanese author about kimono, zakka and kabuki
, Japanese manga artist 
, Japanese table tennis player

Characters
 Rinko Yamato, a character from the manga series My Love Story!!
 Rinko Kuzaki, a character from the manga series Omamori Himari
 Rinko Kougyoku, a character from the anime Jewelpet
 Rinko Kobayakawa, a character from the anime LovePlus
 Rinko, a character from the anime Ghostwire: Tokyo
 Rinko Shirokane, a character from the series BanG Dream!
 Rinko Akaishi, a character from the manga series Kaiju Girl Caramelise
 Rinko Nikaidō, a character from the series Ultimate Muscle
 Rinko Mishima, a character from the series Yume Tsukai
 Rinko Tatsumi, a character from the movie A Snake of June
 Rinko Jerrard, a character from the manga series The Law of Ueki
 Rinko Takemichi, a character from the anime Joran: The Princess of Snow and Blood
 Rinko Takeuchi, a character from the anime The Prince of Tennis
 Rinko Daimon, a character from the series Kamen Rider Wizard
 Rinko Sakuma, a character from the manga series You're Being Summoned, Azazel
 Rinko Matsubaro, a character from the movie Lost Paradise
 Rinko Kamata, a character from the manga series Tokyo Tarareba Girls
 Rinko, a character from the movie Close-Knit
 Rinko Tamaki, a character from the anime Natsuiro Kiseki
 Rinko Ogasawara, a character from the anime Shirobako
 Rinko, a character from the movie Linda Linda Linda
 Rinko Inui, a character from the manga series Aho-Girl
 Rinko Koujiro, a character from the light novel Sword Art Online
 Rinko Hayashi, a voice actress who voiced the character of Marianne from the television drama series Winter Sonata
 Rinko Ozaki, a character from the manga series Purple Eyes in the Dark
Rinko Sudou, a character in manga series Haikyū!!, the position is Captain and number is 5
 Rinko, a character from the movie Love and Goodbye and Hawaii

Japanese feminine given names